Chief Michael Botmang (1938 – 18 January 2014) was a Nigerian politician.

On 9 September 2001, there were riots in Jos between Christians and Muslims. As acting governor, Chief Michael Botmang drafted  both the police and the army to help return the state capital to order.

Botmang, then a former Plateau state deputy governor, was sworn in as governor of Plateau State following the impeachment of Chief Joshua Dariye on 13 November 2006.
He held that position until 27 April 2007, when the Supreme Court ordered the reinstatement of Dariye with immediate effect.

In July 2008 the Economic and Financial Crimes Commission arraigned Botmang on a 31-count charge of fraud, alleging he had pocketed N1.5 billion during his tenure  as Plateau State governor. He was released on bail a month later and his travel documents were returned so he could travel to the United Kingdom for medical treatment.

The fraud charges were later dropped by the EFCC on 12 June 2013 stating that there is evidence that the money borrowed from Intercontinental Bank when Botmang was governor was used to pay workers’ salaries and other government activities.

Botmang died on 18 January 2014, of kidney disease.  He was 76.

References

1938 births
2014 deaths
Governors of Plateau State
People from Jos
Deaths from kidney disease